Richard James Klein (born February 11, 1934 in Pana, Illinois–died December 27, 2005 in Pana, Illinois) was a National Football League and American Football League offensive lineman in the NFL for the Chicago Bears and the Dallas Cowboys, and in the AFL for the Boston Patriots and the Oakland Raiders.  He played college football at the University of Iowa.

Early years
Klein attended Schlarman High School and accepted a scholarship from the University of Georgia. He played in the freshman team, before leaving school to join the Navy during the Korean War.

After leaving his military commitment in 1956, he chose to join the University of Iowa over other schools. He was a teammate of Alex Karras and became the starter at right tackle and defensive tackle.

The next year, he was named an honorable-mention All-American. Head coach Forest Evashevski allowed his release with a year of eligibility still remaining, in order for him to join the Chicago Bears in the National Football League.

Professional career

Chicago Bears
Klein was selected by the Chicago Bears in the 29th round (347th overall) of the 1955 NFL Draft, after his original class had graduated, although his college eligibility wasn't completed.

He was a war veteran and didn't start his professional career until 1958. He was waived before the start of the 1960 season.

Dallas Cowboys
On September 10, 1960, he was claimed off waivers by the Dallas Cowboys. He only played in 7 games (4 starts) because of a broken shoulder. On December 22, he was traded to the Pittsburgh Steelers along with safety Bill Butler, in exchange for safety Dick Moegle.

Pittsburgh Steelers
In 1961, Klein played in 2 games before being released.

Boston Patriots
On October 4, 1961, he was signed as a free agent by the Boston Patriots of the American Football League. The next year, he was named to the AFL All Star team as a defensive tackle. On August 7, 1963, his rights were sold to the Oakland Raiders.

Oakland Raiders
Klein played two seasons for the Oakland Raiders, both as a defensive tackle and offensive tackle.

References

External links
 

1934 births
2005 deaths
People from Pana, Illinois
Players of American football from Illinois
American football offensive tackles
Georgia Bulldogs football players
Iowa Hawkeyes football players
Chicago Bears players
Dallas Cowboys players
Boston Patriots players
Oakland Raiders players
American Football League All-Star players
American Football League players
Pittsburgh Steelers players